K-1 is a professional kickboxing promotion established in 1993, well known worldwide mainly for its heavyweight division fights and Grand Prix tournaments. In January 2012, K-1 Global Holdings Limited, a company registered in Hong Kong, acquired the rights to K-1, and is the current organizer of K-1 events worldwide.

Founded in 1993 by karateka Kazuyoshi Ishii, at its height in the late 90s and the 2000s under the ownership of the Fighting and Entertainment Group (FEG), K-1 was the largest and most prestigious "Kickboxing" organization in the world. With thousands of fighters and watched by millions of fans around the world. K-1 also promoted mixed martial arts events, with some events having both kickboxing and MMA matches on their cards (such as their Dynamite!! series). However, since 2010 K-1 started to lose its status of top organization, as FEG started to have financial issues, not being able to organize big events or pay huge prize money, eventually going bankrupt, and successor holding companies have been unable to maintain events the same level of size during the FEG years.

The letter K in K-1 is officially designated as a representation of words karate, kickboxing and kung fu. Nevertheless, some reports suggest that it represents the initial K found in competing disciplines such as karate, kickboxing, kung fu, kempo, kakutougi (the generic Japanese term for "combat sports"), and taekwondo. Yet another theory claims that the K simply comes from kakutougi and the "1" component pertains to the single weight division (in earlier competition) and the champion's unique position. Nevertheless, the promotion held several tournaments under K-2 and K-3 banners from 1993 to 1995.

K-1 has its own unique ruleset different from other styles of Kickboxing. Because it has become so popular, K-1 is also seen as its own style of kickboxing and sometimes is erroneously considered as a standalone martial art/combat sport. Kickboxing governing bodies such as the ISKA and WKN have also crowned their own "K-1 rules" champions.

History

K-1's predecessor Seidokaikan Karate was formed in 1980 by Kazuyoshi Ishii, a former Kyokushin karate practitioner who had formed his own organization to help promote the best stand-up martial artists. Seidokaikan arranged several successful challenge events against other martial arts organizations, originally using rules based on the Kyokushin Knockdown karate rules, but gradually adapting and changing closer to kickboxing rules. In 1993, Mr. Ishii founded the K-1 organization exclusively as a kickboxing organization, closely cooperating with, but independent from Seidokaikan.

Financial problems
Starting in 2010, multiple stories began to surface regarding the financial troubles of K-1 and their parent company FEG. Simon Rutz, the owner of the Dutch-based kickboxing promotion It's Showtime, claimed in January 2011 that some fighters from It's Showtime had not been paid for fights in K-1.

In early 2011, FEG publicly announced that they were facing financial problems and that the organization would take some months off to restructure. Many fighters and managers spoke out against FEG due to unpaid fight purses and objections to the direction that its owner was taking K-1. It appeared that financial problems were severe, and that FEG could potentially lose ownership of K-1.

The entire K-1 brand, along with most of its trademarks, with the exception of, 'K-1 Koshien', 'K-1 MAX' and 'Dream', were sold to  Japanese real estate firm, Barbizon Corporation Limited, on July 28, 2011.

On February 1, 2012, EMCOM Entertainment Inc. purchased K-1 from Barbizon.

K-1 Global
In March 2012, It's Showtime announced that EMCOM Entertainment established a new company K-1 Global Holdings Ltd. in Hong Kong. K-1 Global Holdings, Ltd., became the new official owner of the K-1 brand. K-1 Global's agreement with promotion required that certain fighters signed under It's Showtime appear in upcoming K-1 Global events.

A number of events were already planned and scheduled for the 2012 calendar before new K-1 ownership took complete control of the company. It's Showtime was the promoter of the first event presented by K-1 Global Holdings Ltd., the K-1 World MAX Final 16. It took place on May 27, 2012, at the Palacio Vistalegre in Madrid, Spain.

After the event, controversy and rumors circulated over the fact that once again, fighters were not paid for their performances. Problems were compounded due to unpaid financial obligations of FEG, and the complete transfer of ownership of the K-1 name was not yet complete. As a result, the K-1 World Grand Prix scheduled for 2012 would be cancelled if these issues were not resolved.

Ultimately, K-1 Global Holdings, Ltd. was blamed for the failure of an event they did not promote. They were also accused of not paying fighters when in fact, the promoter and FEG shared responsibilities in ensuring fighters were paid. The Chairman of the new K-1 resolved the matter by paying fighters what was owed and including a 50% bonus.

It was announced in June 2012 that It's Showtime was purchased by Glory Sports International, eventually to be merged in their new promotion GLORY.

On August 10, 2012, K-1's co-promotion agreement with Romanian-based kickboxing promotion SUPERKOMBAT was announced. Eventually it was ended. Early 2013 SK president Eduard Irimia stated that its company will be independent in 2013 but will still continue to have cooperation with any interested promotion including K-1 by offering fighters.

K-1 World GP
Following the bankruptcy of K-1 Global, the rights to the K-1 brand were acquired by EMCOM Holdings under a subsidiary company called "K-1 Global Holdings Limited", which was founded in Hong Kong in August 2011.

On May 29, 2014, the launch of a K-1 World League was announced. K-1 World League acquired naming rights and exclusive license for the Japanese region from K-1 Global Holding Ltd. "K-1 World League" was subsequently renamed "K-1 World GP" on September 24, 2014.

After its formation, "K-1 World League" formally incorporated the KRUSH. Launched prior to the death of FEG, in 2009, Krush was a collaboration between K-1 and AJKF. It was seen at the time as the second tier of K-1 competition, and produced a number of future K-1 fighters such as Takeru Segawa, Tatsuya Tsubakihara and Leona Pettas, among others. K-1 would later add the KHAOS brand as well, which is seen as the third tier of competition, as a stepping stone between amateur and professional competition. K-1 maintains a number of gyms throughout Japan, from which potential kickboxers can transition from training to amateur competition to professional competition. A fighter can viably spend their entire career under the K-1 umbrella.

On January 26, 2019, Krush was renamed "K-1 KRUSH FIGHT" to further announce the connection between the two brands. However, on December 7, 2019, it was renamed back to Krush. The aim of renaming the competition back to Krush was to dispel the image of the brand as the second tier of K-1.

On September 20, 2016, "K-1 World GP" executive producer Kensaku Maeda retired, and was subsequently replaced by the Krush executive producer Mitsuru Miyata.

From June 2017 onward, "K-1 World GP" started once again started holding events at the Saitama Super Arena. It was further revealed that fighters were signed exclusively to K-1, which wasn't the case previously.

On December 17, 2018, it was announced that the former Krush and K-1 commentator and martial arts writer Takumi Nakamura would replace Mitsuru Miyata as the executive producer.

On February 10, 2023, K-1 agreed on a mutual exchange of fighters with fellow Japanese promotion RISE, after they successfully co-promoted the record-setting Tenshin Nasukawa vs. Takeru pay-per-view. On February 28, 2023, K-1 parent company M-1 Sports Media acquired the global licensing rights for the K-1 brand, which was from that point forward managed by K-1 International Federation (KIF).

Rules
K-1 rules are as follows:

 The fights are contested in a ring which is six or more meters square and surrounded by four ropes.
 Only striking techniques such as punches, sweeps, kicks and knees are allowed. Clinching is allowed (Only for 5 seconds)
 Throws, headbutts and strikes with the elbow are prohibited. Furthermore, spitting, biting, groin strikes, strikes to the back of the head, striking after the round has ended or the referee has called for a break, striking while the opponent is knocked down and excessive holding are all considered fouls.
Matches, both regular and title matches, are contested in three three-minute rounds. In case of a draw, an extension round is fought.
If a fighter is knocked down during the fight, the referee will begin counting to eight until the fighter rises from the canvas. The referee can interrupt the count, or forgo it completely, if he deems the fighter unable to continue competing. Should the fighter remained downed by the time the referee has counted to eight, he is ruled as knocked out and the other fighter will be ruled the winner by knockout.
Matches are scored based on four criteria: 
(1) Number of knockdowns a fighter has scored, with three knockdowns inside of a single round resulting in a technical knockout (two in tournament bouts)
(2) Presence or absence of damage to the opponent
(3) The number clean strikes, with strikes which are thrown with fight ending intention scoring more highly than those thrown with the intent of racking up points
(4) Aggressiveness

List of K-1 events

In the past every year there were dozens of other K-1 qualifying tournaments and preliminaries held around the world.

K-1 has held events in many countries around the world.

The following is a list of countries that K-1 has held events in chronological order:
 Japan (1993–2012, 2014–2020)
 Netherlands (1994, 2001–2003, 2006–2010)
 France (1995, 2002–2008, 2010)
 Switzerland (1995–2000, 2003, 2017)
 United States (1998, 2000–2008, 2012)
 Australia (2000–2005, 2010)
 England (2000, 2002–2004, 2006–2007, 2013)
 Italy (2000–2008)
 Germany (2000–2008)
 Belarus (2000, 2010)
 Croatia (2000, 2002, 2007, 2009–2010, 2013)
 South Africa (2000–2002, 2006)
 New Zealand (2000–2006)
 Czech Republic (2000–2001, 2006–2009)
 Denmark (2001)
 Ukraine (2001–2002, 2006, 2010)
 Spain (2002–2004, 2005–2006, 2012–2014)
 Brazil (2002–2006, 2013)
 Sweden (2003–2010)
 Russia (2003, 2006, 2010)
 Bosnia and Herzegovina (2003–2004, 2009, 2016)
 Scotland (2004)
 Portugal (2004, 2006, 2013)
 Poland (2004, 2007–2010)
 South Korea (2004–2010, 2013)
 Slovenia (2005–2006, 2008)
 Hungary (2005–2010)
 Lithuania (2006–2007, 2010, 2013)
 Latvia (2006–2008)
 Turkey (2007, 2010)
 Belgium (2007)
 Estonia (2007, 2009)
 Romania (2007, 2009–2010)
 Hong Kong (2007)
 Austria (2008)
 Taiwan (2008)
 Moldova (2009–2010, 2013)
 China (2013-2015)
 Greece (2012)
 Canada (2013)
 Ireland (2013)
 Azerbaijan (2014)
 Thailand (2014)
 Serbia (2016)

Tournament format

K-1 Grand Prix

Original K-1 Grand Prix was a single event tournament held in Japan where competitors participated on invitation. By 1998, K-1 introduced the K-1 World Grand Prix format composed of  K-1 Regional Elimination Tournaments (theoretically amounting to six), which qualify fighters for the K-1 World Grand Prix Final, along with licensed K-1 Fighting Network events designed to hold national preliminaries for regional qualification. However, given the fact that K-1's popularity differs greatly among six K-1 regions, which may limit the number of actual elimination tournaments or change locations. For example, K-1 attempted to gain popularity in the United States by holding two GPs, however only a few Americans have ever qualified for the Finals. In 2006 one of the American GPs was relocated to Auckland. Additionally the K-1 Paris GP lost its qualifying right in favor of Amsterdam. Eventually Amsterdam lost it in favor of Łódź, and then Łódź in favor of Bucharest.

K-1 World Grand Prix Final Eliminator ("Final 16") is an event where 16 participants compete for the final eight spots in the Final ("Final 8"). Eight participants from the Final Eliminator meet at the K-1 World Grand Prix Final. Lesser elements in the tournament format have been significantly modified in years. The final was held at Tokyo Dome from 1997 to 2006. The 2012 final took place for the first time in history outside Japan, in Zagreb, Croatia.

K-1 World MAX and other
By 2002, K-1 started the K-1 World MAX ("Middleweight Artistic Xtreme") tournament for 70 kg (154 lb) Middleweight division, following a similar scheme to K-1 World Grand Prix (with theoretically four regional eliminators). In 2007, K-1 introduced two new title belts separate from K-1 World GP Champions, Super Heavyweight World Title for fighters over 100 kg/220 lbs and Heavyweight World Title for fighters under 100 kg/156–220 lbs.

Broadcast
K-1 events have been shown on the Tokyo Broadcasting System and Fuji TV. Following the reformation of K-1 under "K-1 World GP", it bounced between several different broadcasters such as GAORA SPORTS, BS Sky PerfecTV! and TV TOKYO. K-1 events are currently being broadcast by Abema TV.

K-1 Japan Group also operates a YouTube channel where fights, press conferences, and general media is uploaded.

List of K-1 champions

Current K-1 champions

See also

List of K-1 events
List of K-1 champions
Krush
List of male kickboxers
List of Krush champions

References

External links

K-1 Japan

 
Kickboxing organizations
Sports organizations established in 1993
1993 establishments in Japan
Kickboxing in Japan